Iran Khodro Diesel Company is manufacturer of commercial vehicles (trucks, buses, minibuses & vans) in the Iranian market and in the market of several other countries with political agreements in the Middle East, CIS and Africa with half a century experience under license of Daimler Benz of Germany. Iran Khodro Diesel Company has almost 80% of bus and about 70% of the local market share.

History
Iran Khodro Diesel Company was established initially under the name of Khawar Industrial Group in early 1966. The company started its production by assembling one truck a day but after a short period due to the increase demand for commercial vehicles developed production and assembling lines.

In 1999 Iran Khodro Company merged its bus and midi-bus production lines with Khawar Industrial Group truck production lines together and the new company Iran Khodro Diesel, public joint stock was born to manufacture different types of commercial vehicles for domestic and overseas markets.

Production and exports
The company's total annual productions is over 20.000 units of heavy and semi-heavy vehicles such as different types of truck chassis (Tipper, Trailers, Lorries, Cement mixers, Fuel tankers, ...), buses (city buses, [Diesel & CNG], intercity buses and coaches, luxuries VIP buses) and minibus.

Iran Khodro Diesel Company has almost 80% of bus and about 70% of the local market share and exports its products to many countries like Armenia, Kazakhstan, Turkmenistan, Azerbaijan, Ukraine, the United Arab Emirates, the Kingdom of Saudi Arabia, Iraq, Jordan, Kuwait, Qatar, Yemen, Afghanistan, Syria, Algeria, Egypt, Libya, Sudan, Burundi, Burkina Faso, Ivory Coast, Senegal, Guinea, Gambia, Ghana and Venezuela, Egypt, Marshall Islands, Vanuatu, American Samoa and Tahiti.

Products & Concepts

Products

Concepts

Affiliated companies
Iran Khodro Diesel Company is holding by itself several affiliated companies manufacturing required components and parts for production namely as follows:
IDEM (Iran Diesel Engine Manufacturing)
Engine Manufacturer under license of Daimler Benz Germany. From 2002 IDEM, IKD, TKC & EPCO entered to a mutual Project with overseas partners to convert Mercedes OM457 Diesel Engines to CNG dedicated Engines for buses and Hyundai D4AL Minibuses.
CHARKHESHGAR
Gearbox Manufacturer under the license of ZF Germany
VAMCO 
Axles Manufacturer
GOVAH  
After Sales and spare parts Service Company

See also
 Iran Khodro
Iranian automobile industry

References

External links
 Company website

Car manufacturers of Iran
Bus manufacturers of Iran
Truck manufacturers of Iran
Vehicle manufacturing companies established in 1966
Diesel engine manufacturers
Engine manufacturers of Iran
Manufacturing companies based in Tehran
Iranian companies established in 1966